Mildred Eleanor Deegan (December 11, 1919 – July 21, 2002) was an American pitcher, outfielder and second basewoman who played ten seasons in the All-American Girls Professional Baseball League, from  to .

Background
Deegan was one of 25 players who made the All-American Girls Professional Baseball League clubs hailed from New York City and State, including Muriel Bevis, Gloria Cordes, Nancy Mudge, Betty Trezza and Margaret Wigiser. Born in Bensonhurst, Brooklyn, she was a star athlete at Abraham Lincoln High School and in 1935 was the "champion woman baseball thrower" in New York City. "Mildred Eleanor Deegan was born on Dec. 11, 1919, in the Brooklyn neighborhood of Bensonhurst.... She excelled in track and field at Lincoln High School, and after graduation played amateur softball with a team called the Americanettes." She learned baseball from her father, coach of the Brooklyn Bloomer Girls team. As a teenager she placed second behind Babe Didrikson Zaharias in the javelin throw in the national meet before the 1936 Summer Olympics. However, at 16 she was too young. Later, she played fastpitch softball for the New York Americanettes in 1938–39. In 1939 her batting average was .406. That year she was the guest of New York City Mayor Fiorello La Guardia (along with other celebrities) at the opening day of the New York World's Fair. She played later with the Manhattan Beach Girls, who competed in the Metropolitan League in Madison Square Garden. Deegan hit a 250-foot home run inside the building. Babe Ruth, the only other player ever to hit a home run inside the Garden, was in attendance, and posed for a photograph with her, squeezing her biceps. Then, she gained the nickname of "the Babe Ruth of Women's Softball".

Professional career
Deegan joined a Chicago fastpitch softball team for the American Softball Association National Tournament in 1943. She was soon signed by the league to play for the Rockford Peaches. She played for the Peaches until midway through the  season, when she was traded to the Kenosha Comets, beginning a four-year stretch in which she played for six teams. In  Deegan was with the Comets and Springfield Sallies, from  through part of the  season she played with the Fort Wayne Daisies. Her managers and coaches included former big-leaguers Max Carey, Jimmie Foxx, Bill Wambsganss and Marty McManus. Deegan also worked as the league's official photographer.

As a pitcher, she gave up the winning run to the Racine Belles in the final game of the 1946 Shaughnessy series but had a lifetime earned run average of 2.36. Her career batting average was .260.

In , the Brooklyn Dodgers brought Deegan and two other women players to the team's spring training camp at Bear Mountain, New York. She was given permission to travel with the team from manager Leo Durocher but was not allowed to step on the field. However, after retrieving a foul ball during an exhibition game, one of the coaches gave her a fungo bat and let her bat infield practice. Durocher was quoted as saying that "...if we run out of men, Millie will be the first on the team...if she were a man, she no doubt would have been a Dodger."

Retirement
After retiring from baseball Deegan worked as a commercial photographer in Miami, North Carolina, and New Jersey. She also worked for the Western Electric Corporation in Kearney, New Jersey. She served as a coach for a semi-professional women's softball team for 22 years (1958–79) and as a coach at Middlesex County College in the late 1970s. Deegan moved to Florida in 1976 and died at the age of 82 following a two-year battle with breast cancer.

Career statistics
Batting 

Pitching

Fielding

References

External links
Mildred Deegan – Biography / Obituary. All-American Girls Professional Baseball League. Retrieved 2019-04-11.
St. Petersburg Times obituary – Pro ballplayer Millie Deegan dies. Retrieved 2019-04-10.
The Diamond Angle – Three Views of Millie Deegan: Memories of Aunt Millie, by her niece, Joan Barker

1919 births
2002 deaths
All-American Girls Professional Baseball League players
Rockford Peaches players
Kenosha Comets players
Springfield Sallies players
Fort Wayne Daisies players
Peoria Redwings players
Abraham Lincoln High School (Brooklyn) alumni
People from Bensonhurst, Brooklyn
Sportspeople from Brooklyn
Baseball players from New York City
Softball players from New York (state)
20th-century American women